Saskatoon City Hospital is a public hospital in the City Park neighbourhood of Saskatoon, Saskatchewan, Canada. The original hospital was opened in 1909 and was the second municipal hospital in Canada. The original structure was closed and demolished in the early 1990s, with a new City Hospital opening in 1993. The hospital is operated by the Saskatchewan Health Authority. Located close to the Royal University Hospital and only a short drive from St. Paul's Hospital, it is the only general hospital in the city that does not operate a 24-hour emergency room.

See also
 St. Paul's Hospital
 Royal University Hospital
 Jim Pattison Children's Hospital
 Saskatoon Health Region

External links
 Saskatoon Health Region: City Hospital

Hospital buildings completed in 1909
Hospital buildings completed in 1933
Hospitals in Saskatchewan
Buildings and structures in Saskatoon
Hospitals established in 1909
1909 establishments in Saskatchewan
Municipal hospitals